The Rajasthan State Men's League, or R-League A Division, is the top state-level football league in the Indian state of Rajasthan, conducted by Rajasthan Football Association. Inaugural season with 8 participating teams, and concluded on 6 October 2019. Rajasthan United FC became the first ever champion. All matches were played on a single venue, Rajasthan University Sports Complex.

History
The first ever Rajasthan State Men's League started with 8 teams in 2019. Jaipur based JECRC CF won the title.

Clubs
A total of 8 teams participated in the league for last edition in 2021.

Media coverage

List of winners

See also
Rajasthan Football Association

References

Football in Rajasthan
Football leagues in India